Miroslav Kalousek (born 17 December 1960) is a Czech politician, former leader of KDU-ČSL and TOP 09, and has been a member of the Chamber of Deputies (MP) since 1998. He served twice as Finance Minister in the cabinets of Mirek Topolánek and then again from 2010 to 2013 in the government of Petr Nečas.

Early life
Kalousek was born in Tábor. He studied chemistry at the Institute of Chemical Technology in Prague. Between 1984 and 1990, Kalousek worked as a technician at the company Mitas Praha. After the Velvet Revolution, Kalousek became a member of the state service. From 1993 to 1998, he was a deputy minister at the Ministry of Defense, responsible for the budget, army restructuring and acquisitions.

Political career
In 1998, Kalousek was elected as an MP for the Christian Democrats. He was leader of the party from 2003 until 2006.

The 2006 parliamentary election resulted in no party or coalition of parties being able to form a viable government. Over several months a number of alternatives were negotiated with no result. On 24 August 2006 Kalousek unexpectedly accepted an offer from Jiří Paroubek to start negotiations on a minority government of KDU-ČSL and the Social Democratic Party (ČSSD) which would be supported by the Communists. The presidium of the party expressed no objections. Such negotiations were in conflict with pre-election promises and the vocal anti-communist stance of the party and its electorate. On 25 August 2006 mass protests by KDU-ČSL members, regional organisations and members of parliament went public. The party group in Brno (the biggest regional organisation) rejected the negotiated solution and requested the resignation of Kalousek and the whole presidium of KDU-ČSL. Other organisations made similar demands. Some members of parliament declared that they would refuse to support such a government. That evening the national committee of KDU-ČSL rejected the proposal by a large majority and Kalousek resigned. He has claimed his negotiation with Paroubek was intended to prevent a governing coalition of ČSSD and the Civic Democratic Party (ODS), which seemed like the most likely alternative scenario. In the end, ODS refused to participate in a "grand coalition" and formed a minority government.

In 2007, Kalousek was appointed as Finance Minister in Mirek Topolánek's cabinet, a position he held until the cabinet lost a vote of no-confidence in 2009.

In 2009, Kalousek and Karel Schwarzenberg co-founded a pro-European, center-right, conservative political party, TOP 09, which did well in the 2010 legislative election and joined a coalition government with ODS and Public Affairs (VV), with Kalousek becoming Minister of Finance for the second time.

Kalousek was re-elected as an MP in the 2013 legislative election, but lost the post of Finance Minister. In 2015, he was elected as leader of TOP 09, succeeding Karel Schwarzenberg. He announced in July 2020 that he would not be standing for election again, and resigned as an MP on 19 January 2021, arguing that the Chamber of Deputies would become a campaigning platform for the upcoming elections and seats should therefore be occupied by MPs due to stand in the those elections.

References

External links
 Official biography 
 2001 conflict between party leadership and Kalousek

1960 births
Living people
People from Tábor
TOP 09 MPs
Leaders of KDU-ČSL
Government ministers of the Czech Republic
Finance ministers of the Czech Republic
KDU-ČSL MPs
Leaders of TOP 09
KDU-ČSL Government ministers
TOP 09 Government ministers
Members of the Chamber of Deputies of the Czech Republic (1998–2002)
Members of the Chamber of Deputies of the Czech Republic (2002–2006)
Members of the Chamber of Deputies of the Czech Republic (2006–2010)
Members of the Chamber of Deputies of the Czech Republic (2010–2013)
Members of the Chamber of Deputies of the Czech Republic (2013–2017)
Members of the Chamber of Deputies of the Czech Republic (2017–2021)
University of Chemistry and Technology, Prague alumni